Amblymoropsis is a genus of beetles in the family Cerambycidae. It was described by Stephan von Breuning in 1958.

Species 
Amblymoropsis contains the following species:

 Amblymoropsis australica (Breuning, 1963)
 Amblymoropsis fusca Breuning, 1958
 Amblymoropsis papuana (Breuning, 1961)
 Amblymoropsis rufa (Breuning, 1970)

References

Desmiphorini
Beetles described in 1958